Euparyphasma albibasis is a moth in the family Drepanidae first described by George Hampson in 1893. It is found in India, Taiwan and China.

The wingspan is about 68 mm. The forewings are silvery grey, with a white base and a whitish fascia along the costa from one-fifth from the base to the apex. There are waved antemedial and postmedial dark lines and a submarginal series of white specks. The hindwings are pale fuscous, the outer area darker.

Subspecies
Euparyphasma albibasis albibasis (India)
Euparyphasma albibasis cinereofusca (Houlbert, 1921) (Vietnam, China: Sichuan, Yunnan)
Euparyphasma albibasis guankaiyuni Laszlo, G. Ronkay, L. Ronkay & Witt, 2007 (China: Shaanxi, Gansu, Hubei, Jiangxi, Hunan, Fujian, Guangdong, Guangxi)

References

Moths described in 1893
Thyatirinae